Theo Tams (born 12 July 1985) is a Canadian singer and the winner of the sixth season of the CTV reality show Canadian Idol. His debut album, Give It All Away, was released on 19 May 2009 by Sony Music Canada.

Early life
Tams grew up in Coaldale, Alberta, and he attended Immanuel Christian High School in Lethbridge. Tams played trumpet in high school, and is self-taught on piano. Before Idol, he was a student at the University of Lethbridge, studying classical music and psychology. He is taking a leave from his studies to pursue a music career.

Tams released the EP Unexpected in 2005.

Canadian Idol 
At his audition for Canadian Idol in February 2008, Tams drew laughs from the judges as he demonstrated evidence of his anxiety-related perspiration, having soaked through his shirt.

Tams most often performed while playing piano. His performances included "Apologize" by OneRepublic, "Collide" by Howie Day, Bob Marley's "No Woman, No Cry", and Jann Arden's "Good Mother". Idol judge Zack Werner described Tams' performance of Bryan Adams' "Heaven" as "one of the top two or three performances in the history of the show."

He won Canadian Idol on 10 September 2008, after singing three songs on the final performance show that included "Sing" (released to radio and digital download on 11 September 2008), which was the winner's single chosen for him. The runner-up, Nova Scotia carpenter Mitch MacDonald, performed a different song as his own potential winner's single, the first time this has been done on Canadian Idol.

Although the Idol winner's first album usually is released about two months after the show's finale, Tams had much longer to prepare his. Tams said he appreciated the longer time, and hoped to have some songs he wrote himself included on the album.

Performances and results

Post-Idol 
Tams moved to Toronto to work on collaborations for his debut album. Tams toured Canada along with runner-up Mitch MacDonald and third-place finisher Drew Wright in November–December 2008.

Career

Christmas Dream (2008) 
Tams released the single "Christmas Dream", a song he cowrote with Luke McMaster, Simon Wilcox and Greg Johnston. The B-side of the single is a cover of "Christmas (Baby Please Come Home)", and all proceeds are being donated to the charity Free the Children. It peaked at No. 69 on the Canadian Hot 100.

Tams also performed with Eva Avila and David Archuleta for Toronto's CHUM FM's annual Christmas Wish Breakfast.

Give It All Away (2009–2010) 
On 17 March 2009, his first single from his album was released, "Lazy Lovers", written by Tams, Hawksley Workman, and Greg Johnston.

His debut album, Give It All Away, was released on 19 May 2009. It features seven songs he co-wrote, which is more than any previous "Idol". Writing collaborators on the album include Simon Wilcox, Hawksley Workman, Sarah Slean, and Damhnait Doyle. A cross-Canada tour is planned for September.

Tams released a charity Christmas single alongside Ali Slaight called "Do You Hear What I Hear." This song went to No. 1 on the Canadian AC Chart.

Tams's next single is "Manhattan Blue." The music video for the song was released 28 May 2010. The video features So You Think You Can Dance Canada second season winner Tara-Jean Popowich and Vincent Desjardins. The video premiered on ET Canada on 17 June 2010.

In April 2010, Theo Tams sought out a new management and business team to handle his career, a move that has already demonstrated a renewed energy and strategic direction for Theo as he moves to the next level and his all important 'sophomore' album that will create a clear distinction between the 'Idol' and the long-term 'career-artist'.

Tams headlined a 15 date cross-Canada tour with special guests StereoGoesStellar, which started 7 August 2010 and met with much critical acclaim as he toured smaller more intimate venues playing in an up close and personal presentation of his songs solo on piano.

Second studio album (2011–present)
Tams explains that his second album, which will be released in 2011 will be a real "artist" album in so far as it will showcase just exactly who he is and what he stands for as a singer-songwriter. It will dig deeper emotionally than his debut album and represent almost a "song diary" that comes from a mixture of his life experiences since "Give It All Away" and from other parts of his life before his Idol experience. One of his new songs focuses on his experience in Afghanistan. Theo has already begun the intense writing process with one of his heroes, who will also be producing the record. It is expected that the project will be formally announced towards the end of January 2011 and the production team named.

On 28 September, his 3rd EP "Call The Doctor" was released under Hidden Pony records. What many critics are calling the "record of his career", Tams clearly has developed his sound and yells intimate stories of the ups and downs of relationships, coming out to his Christian family, and finally being able to let go of a painful previous relationship.

Personal life
Tams came out as gay during the show's run by referring to a male partner during one of his post-performance interviews. This made him the first openly gay performer to win an Idol series in North America. He subsequently endorsed Adam Lambert in the 2009 edition of American Idol, and included two gay couples, one male and one female, in the video for his single "Lazy Lovers" Theo is also a fan of Ellen DeGeneres, and wants to be on her show. He also admires Mother Teresa and her work.

On 28 June 2010, Tams took a trip to Afghanistan to perform for the Canadian troops on Canada Day. This was an opportunity for him to visit Canadian and allied troops not only on the base in Kandahar but he travelled by Blackhawk outside of the wire to meet with and hear the stories of the front-line troops. On 14 July, he told Canada AM that it was "the most surreal experiences I've ever had."

Discography

Albums
Give It All Away (2009)
Back Pocket (2014)
Call The Doctor (2018)
Trilogy 1 (2021)

Singles
 "Sing" (2008)
 "Christmas Dream" (2008)
 "Lazy Lovers" (2009)
 "Wait for You" (2009)
 "Do You Hear What I Hear?" duet w/ Ali Slaight (2009)
 "Manhattan Blue" (2010)
 "2000 Miles" duet w/ Ali Slaight (2011)
 "When You're Not Around" (2014)
 "Stay" (2014)
 "Back Pocket" (2015)
 "Strangers" (2018)
”Weeds” (2018)

”Therapy” (2020)
”Gasoline” (2021)
”Fixable” (2021)
"Jekyll Hyde Love' (2021)
”The Feeling (Hate 2 Love)” (2021)

Awards and nominations

Tours
 2008: Canadian Idols LIVE! Tour 2008
 2009: Give It All Away Tour
 2010: ''Taking It All Back Tour : 2010" w/sg StereoGoesStellar

See also

Canadian rock
Music of Canada

References

External links
 

Canadian Idol winners
Canadian keyboardists
Canadian pop pianists
1985 births
Living people
Musicians from Alberta
People from Lethbridge
Canadian LGBT singers
Canadian gay musicians
Canadian male pianists
21st-century Canadian pianists
21st-century Canadian male singers
Canadian pop singers
20th-century Canadian LGBT people
21st-century Canadian LGBT people